ADMIXTOOLS (or AdmixTools) is an R software package that is primarily used for analyzing admixture in population genetics. The initial version was originally developed by Nick Patterson and colleagues in 2012. The second reimplemented version, ADMIXTOOLS 2, which has a revised point-and-click interface and improved speed, was developed jointly by Nick Patterson and David Reich.

qpGraph
qpGraph is a software program that is part of the ADMIXTOOLS software package developed by Patterson et al. (2012). qpGraph builds graphs that model genetic admixture in population relationships. It estimates network topology likelihoods from a fixed number of admixture events, based on the observed f-statistics.

Other tools
Related statistical tools in the ADMIXTOOLS software package include qpAdm, qpDstat, and qpWave. qpDstat and qpWave test to see if populations form clades, while qpAdm estimates ancestry proportions.

See also
SplitsTree
Dendroscope
List of phylogenetics software

References

External links
ADMIXTOOLS 2 – inferring demographic history from genetic data
AdmixTools at GitHub
qpGraph software package in Bioconductor 3.8. 
admixr – R package for reproducible analyses using ADMIXTOOLS

Phylogenetics software
Free R (programming language) software